St Paul's Church, formally known as The Parish Church of the Conversion of Saint Paul, is a Roman Catholic parish church located in the village of Safi in Malta.

The Parish
Before Safi became an independent parish in 1598, it formed part of the medieval parish of Bir Miftuħ, which is nowadays part of the parish of Gudja. The parish of St Mary of Bir Miftuħ is one of the original medieval parishes that are mentioned by Bishop Senatore de Mello in 1436. In 1592, the villages of Safi, Mqabba, and Kirkop were merged into a single parish, with St Leonard in Kirkop becoming the parish church. On April 13, 1598 Safi became an independent parish.

The church
The original church of St Paul was much smaller than the present building. It was chosen from among five of the churches in the village to serve as the parish church. The present Baroque church, which is in the doric style, was built on the site of the original one between 1727 and 1744. It was consecrated on October 10, 1784.

Interior
The church has a number of paintings. Among these are the titular painting, by Stefano Erardi, which is located behind the high altar and depicts the conversion of St Paul.

References

18th-century Roman Catholic church buildings in Malta
Safi, Malta
National Inventory of the Cultural Property of the Maltese Islands
Roman Catholic churches completed in 1744